Gmina Rudnik may refer to either of the following rural administrative districts in Poland:
Gmina Rudnik, Lublin Voivodeship
Gmina Rudnik, Silesian Voivodeship